Moravian spice cookies are a traditional kind of cookie that originated in the Colonial American communities of the Moravian Church. The blend of spices and molasses, rolled paper thin, has a reputation as the "World's Thinnest Cookie".  They are related to German Lebkuchen; original recipes can be traced back to the 17th century.

The cookie is especially popular around, and usually associated with, Christmas in communities with a strong Moravian background such as Winston-Salem, North Carolina and Bethlehem, Pennsylvania, which still maintain the two largest Moravian communities in the United States. Traditionally, prominent homes in the community hosted open houses which contained elaborate Nativity scenes.  These scenes were often built around large tree stumps which were found in the woods near the town.  People opened their homes for viewings of these scenes, and offering cookies to guests was an important part of the tradition.  The spice cookies were central to the occasion, but  many families also made a sugar cookie which was made with butter and flavored heavily with nutmeg.  Families made their own cookie cutters and handed them down to family members.  The shapes were primarily farm animals, as part of the Nativity tradition. Families often had a few cookie cutters which were large and intricate and took real skill to cut out and bake.  Although there are a few bakeries that still roll and cut the cookies by hand, some now use a mechanized process for making the cookies in order to meet the demand.  While this does not affect the taste, the machine-made cookies have been criticized for not being as thin as their handmade counterparts.

While the spice recipe is the most traditional and well-known of the Moravian cookies, other versions have appeared over the years, including sugar, lemon, black walnut, and chocolate varieties.

References

Cookies
Traditions of the Moravian Church
Christmas in the United States
Christmas food
Christian cuisine